Hooghly Mohsin College (HMC) began on 1 August 1836 as the New Hooghly College. It was established by Muhammad Mohsin, who also started other colleges. On its 100th anniversary it was renamed Hooghly Mohsin College. It became affiliated to University of Calcutta since the latter's initiation in 1857. After the establishment of the University of Burdwan in 1960, the college became its constituent.

Accreditation
Recently, Hooghly Mohsin College has been awarded B++ grade by the National Assessment and Accreditation Council (NAAC). The college is recognized by the University Grants Commission (UGC).

Hooghly Mohsin has been recognized by the University Grants Commission as a "College with Potential for Excellence." The Department of Biotechnology, government of India, has recognized it as a "STAR COLLEGE." The Department of Science & Technology, government of India, has selected this college under "Fund for Improvement of Science & Technology Infrastructure" (DST-FIST) scheme.

Notable alumni
 Muzaffar Ahmed, politician
 Upendranath Brahmachari, scientist
 Bankim Chandra Chattopadhyay, composer and writer
 Sanjib Chandra Chattopadhyay, writer
 Kanailal Dutta, revolutionary
 Shyamal Mitra, singer
 Ashutosh Mukhopadhyay, author
 Tapas Paul, actor and politician
 Dwijendralal Ray, writer
 Brahmabandhav Upadhyay, theologian
  Abu Mohammed Habibullah, historian

Sports Accolades 
 The college has produced many eminent sports person who has represented in national and international arena, like in Football, Surajit Sengupta, Swarup Das, Goutam Ghosh, Anit Ghosh, Athletics - Monoranjan Porel and Amit Saha and in Cricket - Prosenjit Ganguly (Bengal Ranji trophy).

See also
 Education in India
 Education in West Bengal
 James Esdaile
 List of institutions of higher education in West Bengal

References

 Crawford, D.G., A History of the Indian Medical Service, 1600-1913, W. Thacker & Co., (London), 1914. 
 Dey, S.C., "Hooghly Past and Present", The Calcutta Review, Vol.96, No.191, (January 1893), pp.22-42; No.192, (April 1893), 276-288; Vol.97, No.193, (July 1893), pp.71-81; No.194, (October 1893), 340-366;Vol.98, No.195, (January 1894), pp.152-170; Vol.99, No.197, (July 1894), pp.153-164; Vol.104, No.208, (April 1897), pp.355-373.
 Annual Report of the College of Hadji Mohammud Moshin with its Subordinate Schools; and of the Colleges of Dacca and Kishnaghur, for 1850-51, F. Carbery, Military Orphan Press, (Calcutta), 1851.
 Zachariah, K., History of Hooghly College, 1836-1936, Bengal Government Press, (Alipore), 1936.

External links

Universities and colleges in Hooghly district
Colleges affiliated to University of Burdwan
Law schools in West Bengal
Educational institutions established in 1836
1836 establishments in India